Detroit is a town in Lamar County, Alabama, United States. It was incorporated in 1955. At the 2010 census the population was 237, down from 247 in 2000. The prior name of the town was Millville due to the many mills built in the late 1800s.

Geography
Detroit is located at  (34.025859, -88.171810).

Demographics

As of the census of 2000, there were 247 people, 102 households, and 78 families residing in the town. The racial makeup of the town was 79.35% White and 20.65% Black or African American.

There were 102 households, out of which 40.2% had children under the age of 18 living with them, 52.9% were married couples living together, 21.6% had a female householder with no husband present, and 23.5% were non-families. 23.5% of all households were made up of individuals, and 12.7% had someone living alone who was 65 years of age or older. The average household size was 2.42 and the average family size was 2.85.

In the town, the population was spread out, with 30.0% under the age of 18, 6.1% from 18 to 24, 30.4% from 25 to 44, 20.6% from 45 to 64, and 13.0% who were 65 years of age or older. The median age was 35 years. For every 100 females, there were 85.7 males. For every 100 females age 18 and over, there were 71.3 males.

The median income for a household in the town was $19,531, and the median income for a family was $29,750. Males had a median income of $24,643 versus $20,000 for females. The per capita income for the town was $10,107. About 30.2% of families and 23.9% of the population were below the poverty line, including 28.6% of those under the age of eighteen and 13.5% of those 65 or over.

References

Towns in Lamar County, Alabama
Towns in Alabama